Donje Vidovo  is a village in the municipality of Paraćin, Serbia. According to the 2002 census, the village has a population of 1932 people.

References

Populated places in Pomoravlje District